Grosso is a comune (municipality) in the Metropolitan City of Turin in the Italian region Piedmont, located about  northwest of Turin.

Grosso borders the following municipalities: Corio, Mathi, Nole, and Villanova Canavese.

References

Cities and towns in Piedmont